Harry Lockwood West (28 July 1905 – 28 March 1989) was a British actor. He was the father of actor Timothy West and the grandfather of actor Samuel West.

Life and career
West was born in Birkenhead, Cheshire, England in 1905, the son of Mildred (née Hartley) and Henry Cope West, and through his mother a fourth cousin of the actress Margaret Lockwood, their common ancestor being Joseph Lockwood (c.1758–1837), a former Mayor of Doncaster, West Riding of Yorkshire. West married the actress Olive Carleton-Crowe (died 1985) and with her had two children; a son, the actor Timothy West, and a daughter, Patricia.

He made his stage debut in 1926 as Lieutenant Allen in Alf's Button at the Hippodrome Theatre in Margate, Kent. His London stage debut was as Henry Bevan in The Barretts of Wimpole Street at the Queen's Theatre in 1931.

West's television appearances included Just William (1962), Dr. Finlay's Casebook (1964), No Hiding Place (1965), The Prisoner (1967), Doctor at Large (1971), Please Sir! (1972), The Pallisers (1974), I, Claudius (1976), Porterhouse Blue (1987) and posthumously in Specials (1991).  He portrayed King Edward VII in 1972 in an episode of the LWT television drama series Upstairs, Downstairs entitled "Guest of Honour" - in which the King visited the family for dinner, and also in the BBC television drama series The Life and Times of David Lloyd George in 1981.  His son Timothy West was to also play the King in the 1975 television series Edward the Seventh.

His film appearances include A Song for Tomorrow (1948), Bedazzled (1967), Up the Junction (1968), Jane Eyre (1970), The Satanic Rites of Dracula (1973), Young Sherlock Holmes (1985) and as Geoffrey in The Dresser (1983) .

On BBC Radio West appeared in numerous drama productions from the 1940s to the 1980s and between 1969 and 1980 played the role of Arthur Tyson in the BBC Radio 2 daily serial Waggoners' Walk. 

He died of cancer on 28 March 1989 in Brighton.

Selected filmography

A Song for Tomorrow (1948) – Mr. Stokes
Badger's Green (1949) – Managing director
Edward, My Son (1949) – Hall porter (uncredited)
Celia (1949) – Dr. Cresswell
No Place for Jennifer (1950) – Head Salesman at Jeweller's Shop
Last Holiday (1950) – Dinsdale
High Treason (1951) – Minister (uncredited)
Hammer the Toff (1952) – Kennedy
The Oracle (1953) – Adams
Sailor of the King (1953) – Lt. Marsh (uncredited)
Seagulls Over Sorrento (1954) – Curly, Stores Petty Officer (uncredited)
Lease of Life (1954) – The Bookdealer
Private's Progress (1956) – Detective (uncredited)
The Birthday Present (1957) – Mr. Barraclough
The Mark of the Hawk (1957) – Magistrate
The Man Who Could Cheat Death (1959) – First Doctor (uncredited)
Tunes of Glory (1960) – Provost
Strongroom (1962) – Police Inspector
The Running Man (1963) – Bank Manager
The Leather Boys (1964) – Reggie's Father
Game for Three Losers (1965) – Justice Tree
Rotten to the Core (1965) – Bank Manager (uncredited)
Life at the Top (1965) – Man at 1st meeting (uncredited)
Bedazzled (1967) – St. Peter
Up the Junction (1968) – Magistrate
A Dandy in Aspic (1968) – Quince
Jane Eyre (1970) – Reverend Wood
One Brief Summer (1970) – Ebert
The Satanic Rites of Dracula (1973) – Freeborne
The Dresser (1983) – Geoffrey Thornton
The Shooting Party (1985) – Rogers
Young Sherlock Holmes (1985) – Curio Shop Owner

References

External links

1905 births
1989 deaths
Deaths from cancer in England
British male film actors
English male stage actors
English male television actors
People from Birkenhead
20th-century English male actors
Male actors from Cheshire